Tarsod Ganapati Temple is a Hindu temple dedicated to Ganesha in a village Tarsod of Jalgaon district, Maharashtra. The temple is 8 km away from Jalgaon.

The temple finds mentions in various scripts written about Sai Baba of Shirdi and Gajanan Maharaj. During the Maratha Empire, the region was under the jagir ruled by Nimbalkar family.

References

Ganesha temples
Tourist attractions in Jalgaon district